"Catch" is the name of a 1987 single by The Cure from their album Kiss Me, Kiss Me, Kiss Me. The single was not released in the US. It charted at #27 in the UK.

Track listing

7": Fiction / Fics 26 (UK) 
 "Catch" (2:43)
 "Breathe" (4:47)

12": Fiction / Ficsx 26 (UK)
 "Catch" (2:43)
 "Breathe" (4:47)
 "A Chain of Flowers" (4:55)

12": Polydor/ 888 728-1 (Germany)
 "Catch" (2:43)
 "Breathe" (4:47)
 "Kyoto Song [Live in Orange]" (5:23)
 "A Night Like This [Live in Orange]" (4:30)

CDV: Fiction / 080 186-2 (UK)
 "Catch" (2:43)
 "Breathe" (4:47)
 "A Chain of Flowers" (4:55)
 "Icing Sugar [New Mix]" (3:20)
 "Catch" (2:43) [Video]

Personnel
Robert Smith - vocals, guitars
Lol Tolhurst - keyboards
Porl Thompson - guitars
Simon Gallup - basses
Boris Williams - drums, percussion

References

The Cure songs
1987 singles
Songs written by Robert Smith (musician)
1987 songs
Fiction Records singles
Songs written by Porl Thompson
Songs written by Lol Tolhurst
Songs written by Simon Gallup
Songs written by Boris Williams
Song recordings produced by David M. Allen